Sophie Kauer (born September 2001) is a British-German cellist and actress. She made her screen debut in the 2022 Todd Field film, Tár, where she starred alongside Cate Blanchett.

Life and career
Kauer was born in London. At the age of 8 she began learning to play the cello; she was accepted 18 months later into the Junior Department of the Royal Academy of Music, where she studied with Melissa Phelps. She studied at the Academy on a scholarship for seven years and simultaneously attended Guildford High School.

In 2019 Kauer was named "Young Musician of the Year" by the Woking Music Festival. Since Autumn 2020 Kauer has been studying at the Norwegian Academy of Music with cellist .

Kauer was cast in the role of Olga in the 2022 film Tár; her prior acting experience had been minimal. According to interviews, she found out about the casting call in a Facebook post in February 2021. A friend had sent it encouraging her to try out. With COVID-19 lockdowns canceling in-person lessons and concerts, as well as restricting people from leaving their homes, Kauer decided to audition because she thought it was "really cool". She also said she had no expectations of success and believed Tár would be an "amazing way to bring classical music to the attention of a whole new audience". She auditioned via Zoom, then later received a call asking her to submit a recording of herself playing Edward Elgar's Cello Concerto. After a week she was informed by Todd Field and one of the film's casting directors that her audition had been successful.

Kauer recorded portions of the Elgar Cello Concerto with the London Symphony Orchestra in the soundtrack album for Tár. Despite her role in the film, she said that playing the cello remains her focus.

References

External links

 
 Profile, kulmag.live
 

2001 births
British actresses
British cellists
German actresses
German cellists
Musicians from London
People educated at Guildford High School
Alumni of the Royal Academy of Music
Norwegian Academy of Music alumni
Living people